Boutaleb is a town and commune in Setif Province in north-eastern Algeria.

The city contains is an Arab tribe (Ahl Boutaleb) from the Ayad, a branch of the Banu Hilal.

References

Communes of Sétif Province
Sétif Province